Serkan Dökme (born 18 July 1977) is a retired Turkish football midfielder.

References

1977 births
Living people
Turkish footballers
Altay S.K. footballers
Samsunspor footballers
Manisaspor footballers
Malatyaspor footballers
Tokatspor footballers
Association football midfielders
Süper Lig players
Turkey under-21 international footballers